Larisa Neiland and Jana Novotná were the defending champions but only Neiland competed that year with Rennae Stubbs.

Neiland and Stubbs won in the final 6–4, 6–7, 7–5 against Pam Shriver and Elizabeth Smylie.

Seeds
Champion seeds are indicated in bold text while text in italics indicates the round in which those seeds were eliminated.

 Larisa Neiland /  Rennae Stubbs (champions)
 Pam Shriver /  Elizabeth Smylie (final)
 Rika Hiraki /  Fang Li (first round)
 Ei Iida /  Maya Kidowaki (first round)

Draw

External links
 1994 Asian Open Doubles Draw

Asian Open (tennis)
1994 WTA Tour